The Glass Jungle is a 1988 action film directed by Joseph Merhi and distributed by Troma Entertainment. Set on the streets of Los Angeles, the film follows a female detective as she races against time to find the murderer of several prostitutes.

External links

1988 films
1988 action films
American independent films
Troma Entertainment films
American action films
1988 independent films
Films directed by Joseph Merhi
1980s English-language films
1980s American films